Wáng Shàotáng (王少堂; 1889–1968) is the stage name of the Chinese artist of Yangzhou storytelling, whose birth name is Wáng Dézhuāng. As a master of Yangzhou storytelling, his most famous works are The 10 chapters of Wu Song, The 10 chapters of Song Jiang, The 10 chapters of Lu Junyi, and The 10 chapters of Shi Xiu.

Wang Shaotang began to study Yanzhou storytelling when he was only 7 years old. At the age of 12, he made his debut with The 10 chapters of Wu Song in Yangzhou. Since then, his career got under way.

External links
Wang's profile at Shoushu.com

1889 births
1968 deaths
Chinese storytellers
People persecuted to death during the Cultural Revolution